Jadla is a village in Shaheed Bhagat Singh Nagar district of Punjab State, India. The village is administrated by Sarpanch an elected representative of the village.

Demography 
As of 2011, Jadla has a total number of 895 houses and population of 4442 of which 2309 include are males while 2133 are females according to the report published by Census India in 2011. The literacy rate of Jadla is 80.39%, higher than the state average of 75.84%. The population of children under the age of 6 years is 460 which is 10.36% of total population of Jadla, and child sex ratio is approximately 847 as compared to Punjab state average of 846.

Most of the people are from Schedule Caste which constitutes 47.01% of total population in Jadla. The town does not have any Schedule Tribe population so far.

As per the report published by Census India in 2011, 1447 people were engaged in work activities out of the total population of Jadla which includes 1293 males and 154 females. According to census survey report 2011, 81.69% workers describe their work as main work and 18.31% workers are involved in Marginal activity providing livelihood for less than 6 months.

Education 
The village has a Punjabi medium, co-ed upper primary with secondary/higher secondary school founded in 1929. The school provide mid-day meal as per Indian Midday Meal Scheme and also provide free education to children between the ages of 6 and 14 as per Right of Children to Free and Compulsory Education Act.

KC Engineering College and Doaba Khalsa Trust Group Of Institutions are the nearest colleges.

Landmarks 
Gurudwara Sahib Shiri Guru Ravidass Ji Maharaj, Gurudwara Singh Sabha, Gurudawa Shahib Shaheed Singh, Shiv Mandir and Mata Parvati Mandir, Panj Peer Darwar, are religious sites. The village has 3 banks and 4 ATM facility and Police Post. Police Post Jadla is located near Mini Bus stand Palace Road Jadla. Police Post Jadla is  under The jurisdiction of Police Station Sadar Nawanshahr.

Transport 

See also 
List of villages in India

References

External links 
 Tourism of Punjab
 Census of Punjab
 Locality Based PINCode

Villages in Shaheed Bhagat Singh Nagar district